With Sympathy is the debut studio album by American industrial band Ministry, released on May 10, 1983 by Arista Records. The group was formed in 1981 by lead singer and multi-instrumentalist Al Jourgensen, with drummer Stephen George being the most notable member of its initial lineup. The album was briefly re-released overseas as Work for Love.

Background and recording
In late 1981, Jourgensen was living in Chicago and involved in its underground scene. He began to write and record songs in his apartment, using a newly bought ARP Omni synthesizer, a drum machine and a reel-to-reel tape recorder. At one point, a demo tape featuring the song "I'm Falling" gained the attention of Wax Trax! Records label co-founder and co-owner Jim Nash. Impressed by the demo, Nash offered to record its material professionally and to assemble the touring band, which Jourgensen named Ministry. At Chicago's Hedden West Studios, Jourgensen, with co-producers Jay O'Roarke and Iain Burgess, recorded Ministry's first material, a 12" single featuring the tracks "I'm Falling", "Primental" and "Cold Life".

Jourgensen assembled the band's first live lineup, a five-piece group including Jourgensen on vocals and guitar, bassist Martin Sorenson, keyboardists Robert Roberts and John Davis and drummer Stephen George. Jourgensen and Roberts state that Roberts' inclusion in the group occurred because their mutual friend Paul Taylor was ill and unable to join.

While touring the Midwest and the Northeast during 1982, Ministry received some commercial success with "Cold Life." The band gained the attention of Arista label executives, who chose to sign them. With Sympathy was recorded in Autumn 1982 with producers Vince Ely and Ian Taylor at the Syncro Sound recording studio in Boston.

Critical reception 
On release, With Sympathy received mixed critical reviews. Rolling Stone noted that any lack of originality in the synth-pop concept was "... hardly worth complaining about, because Ministry manages to do something many far more innovative bands neglect: they write catchy dance songs." The review further observed that Jourgensen's singing was "... charged with anger, passion and glee–real emotions instead of the vocal posturing so common in synth-pop." The album achieved commercial success, peaking at number 94 in the Billboard 200 and selling more than 100,000 copies in the U.S. by 2007. The album was promoted with three singles—"Work for Love", "I Wanted to Tell Her" and "Revenge"—and the three-month tour. A music video was made for the single "Revenge."

Retrospective impressions by Al Jourgensen 
Following the tour's completion, Jourgensen's dissatisfaction over his record deal led the band to depart Arista in early 1984. Jourgensen later disowned the album, maintaining that he had been pressured by Arista management into the then-popular synth-pop style, which is in contrast to the harder industrial and heavy metal sounds that he would later develop. He compared the experience to that of Milli Vanilli. Jourgensen has described the album as a "sonic abortion." He also claims that Arista had prevented songs that he had written in 1982 from appearing on the album; these tracks would eventually appear on The Land of Rape and Honey and Twitch.

However, according to Ian MacKaye, with whom Jourgensen formed Pailhead, Jourgensen discovered hardcore music after his synth-pop work, a statement that Jourgensen repeated in the documentary film Industrial Accident: The Story of Wax Trax! Records. Former keyboardist Robert Roberts refutes claims that Jourgensen was forced by Arista to "make the record cheesy," saying that the finished product was simply watered down and did not properly capture the band's live sound. Additionally, video recordings of Ministry concerts in Chicago several years before their signing with Arista show the band playing synth-pop and dressed in new wave and dark wave styles.

Jourgensen assumes a false English accent for all of the songs, for which he later expressed regret. His ex-wife Patty stated in 2013 that doing so was an homage to bands that he had liked.

Jourgensen has since made peace with the album, saying that "... because of that record I wouldn’t be who I am today. I think without that record, I wouldn’t be as much of a fucking maniac douchebag. So I’m thankful for it now."

Reissue 
With Sympathy was out of print for many years, and Jourgensen claimed that he had destroyed the master tapes. In 2012, Eastworld Records reissued the album with three bonus tracks.

"Effigy (I'm Not An)" was used in a scene in HBO's Euphoria.

Track listing

"What He Say" was renamed "Do the Etawa" on the European release.
The European LP release has the 7" remix of "I Wanted To Tell Her" instead of the U.S. album version. All CD versions use the U.S. album version.

Personnel
Credits adapted from the liner notes of With Sympathy.

Ministry
 Alain Jourgensen - vocals, guitar , keyboards, drums 
 Stephen George - drums , percussion

Additional musicians
 Robert Roberts - keyboards , bass keyboard 
 Marybeth O'Hara - vocals 
 Shay Jones - feature vocals 
 John Davis - keyboards 
 Walter Turbitt - guitar 
 Martin Sorenson - bass guitar 
 Vince Ely - percussion & keyboards 
 Antonia de Portago - vocals 
 Brad Hallen - bass guitar 
 Ministry of Horns - horns 
 Ziv Gidron - chanting 
 Doreen Chanter - vocals 
 Bob Suber - saxophone

Technical staff
 Ian Taylor - producer, engineer
 Vince Ely - producer
 David Wooley - engineer
 Flood - engineer
 David Heglmeier - tape operator
 Roger Merritt - tape operator
 Steve Jackson - tape operator
 Greg Calbi - mastering
 Joe Gastwirt - digital remastering

Management
 Steve Berkowitz - manager
 Elliot Roberts - manager

Artwork
 Alberto Rizzo - photographer
 David Gahr - inner sleeve photographer
 Brian Shanley - cover concepts
 Jim Nash - cover concepts

Chart positions

Album

Singles

References

Bibliography

External links 

Video for "Revenge" on YouTube

1983 debut albums
Arista Records albums
Ministry (band) albums